The plague of 664 was an epidemic that affected Britain and Ireland in 664 AD, during the first plague pandemic. It was the first recorded epidemic in English history, and coincided with a solar eclipse. It was considered by later sources as "The Yellow Plague of 664" and said to have lasted for twenty or twenty-five years, causing widespread mortality, social disruption and abandonment of religious faith. The disease responsible was probably Plague – part of the First Plague Pandemic – or else smallpox.

According to the Irish Annals of Tigernach, the plague was preceded by a solar eclipse on 1 May 664 (the path of the total eclipse on 1 May 664 started in the Pacific, crossed the Gulf of Mexico, swept along the eastern coast of North America crossed Ireland and Scotland and continued on into Central Europe). Bede also mentioned the eclipse but wrongly placed it on 3 May. The Irish sources claimed that there was also an earthquake in Britain and that the plague reached Ireland first at Mag Nitha, among the Fothairt in Leinster. Bede claimed that the plague first was in the south of Britain and then spread to the north.

Bede wrote this about it:  In the same year of our Lord 664, there happened an eclipse of the sun, on the third day of May, about the tenth hour of the day. In the same year, a sudden pestilence depopulated first the southern parts of Britain, and afterwards attacking the province of the Northumbrians, ravaged the country far and near, and destroyed a great multitude of men. By this plague the aforesaid priest of the Lord, Tuda, was carried off, and was honourably buried in the monastery called Paegnalaech. Moreover, this plague prevailed no less disastrously in the island of Ireland. Many of the nobility, and of the lower ranks of the English nation, were there at that time, who, in the days of the Bishops Finan and Colman, forsaking their native island, retired thither, either for the sake of sacred studies, or of a more ascetic life; and some of them presently devoted themselves faithfully to a monastic life, others chose rather to apply themselves to study, going about from one master's cell to another. The Scots willingly received them all, and took care to supply them with daily food without cost, as also to furnish them with books for their studies, and teaching free of charge. 
According to Adomnan of Iona, a contemporary Irish abbot and saint, the plague affected everywhere in the British Isles except for a large area in modern Scotland. Adomnan considered the plague a divine punishment for sins, and he believed that the Picts and Irish who lived in northern Great Britain were spared from the plague due to the intercession of Saint Columba who had founded monasteries among them. Adomnan personally walked among victims of the plague and claimed that neither he nor his companions became sick.

References

See also
 First plague pandemic
 Plague of Mohill, first recorded Irish plague

First plague pandemic
664
7th century in England
7th century in Ireland
Ailments of unknown cause
Plague deaths